Pauline Gray (born 9 April 1951) is an Australian former swimmer. She competed in two events at the 1968 Summer Olympics.

References

External links
 

1951 births
Living people
Australian female butterfly swimmers
Olympic swimmers of Australia
Swimmers at the 1968 Summer Olympics
Swimmers from Melbourne